The Marysvale volcanic field is located in southwestern Utah, United States.

One of the largest volcanic fields in the western United States, the Marysvale straddles the Colorado Plateau-Great Basin transition zone. Most igneous rocks belong to a middle Cenozoic (~32 to 22 million years old) calc-alkaline sequence, although about 5% are related to an upper Cenozoic (23 million years to Holocene) bimodal (basalt and rhyolite) sequence. The Marysvale contains a variety of volcanic features, including stratovolcanoes, calderas, lava domes, and cinder cones.

The field is an example of intraplate volcanism; its earlier deposits are thought to be related to Farallon plate subduction, while the later bimodal assemblage (especially the basalts) have been linked to Basin and Range extension.

Notable calderas

See also 

 Geology of the Bryce Canyon area
 Large volume volcanic eruptions in the Basin and Range Province
 Tushar Mountains, Delano Peak

References 

 

Volcanic fields of the Great Basin section
Volcanic fields of Utah
Holocene volcanoes
Miocene volcanoes
Oligocene volcanoes
Pleistocene volcanoes
Pliocene volcanoes
Landforms of Piute County, Utah
Landforms of Sevier County, Utah
Holocene North America
Miocene North America
Oligocene North America
Pleistocene North America
Pliocene North America
Paleogene United States
Neogene United States
Quaternary United States
Calderas of Utah